This is a list of 100 species in Charidotella, a genus of tortoise beetles in the family Chrysomelidae.

Charidotella species

 Charidotella actiosa (Spaeth, 1926) i c g
 Charidotella ambita (Champion, 1894) i c g
 Charidotella amicula (Spaeth, 1936) i c g
 Charidotella amoena (Boheman, 1855) i c g
 Charidotella amoenula (Boheman, 1855) i c g
 Charidotella annexa (Boheman, 1855) i c g
 Charidotella atalanta (Boheman, 1862) i c g
 Charidotella atromarginata Borowiec, 2009 i c g
 Charidotella bifasciata (Linnaeus, 1758) i c g
 Charidotella bifossulata (Boheman, 1855) i c g b
 Charidotella bifoveata (Spaeth, 1926) i c g
 Charidotella bisbinotata (Boheman, 1855) i c g
 Charidotella bistillata (Spaeth, 1936) i c g
 Charidotella bivulnerata (Boheman, 1855) i c g
 Charidotella bordoni Borowiec, 2002 i c g
 Charidotella carnulenta (Erichson, 1847) i c g
 Charidotella chanchamayana (Spaeth, 1926) i c g
 Charidotella cingulata (Boheman, 1862) i c
 Charidotella circumnotata (Boheman, 1862) i c g
 Charidotella conclusa (Boheman, 1855) i c g
 Charidotella connectens (Boheman, 1855) i c g
 Charidotella cyclographa (Boheman, 1855) i c g
 Charidotella discoidalis (Boheman, 1855) i c g
 Charidotella dominicanensis Borowiec, 2011 i c g
 Charidotella duplex (Champion, 1894) i c g
 Charidotella ecuadorica Borowiec, 1989 i c g
 Charidotella egregia (Boheman, 1855) i c g
 Charidotella emarginata (Boheman, 1855) i c g b
 Charidotella ferranti (Spaeth, 1926) i c
 Charidotella flaviae de Andrade Maia and Buzzi, 2005 i c g
 Charidotella fumosa (Boheman, 1855) i c g
 Charidotella glaucina (Boheman, 1855) i c g
 Charidotella glaucovittata (Erichson, 1847) i c g
 Charidotella goyazensis (Spaeth, 1936) i c g
 Charidotella granaria (Boheman, 1855) i c g
 Charidotella guadeloupensis (Boheman, 1855) i c g
 Charidotella hoegbergi (Boheman, 1855) i c g
 Charidotella immaculata (Olivier, 1790) i c g
 Charidotella incerta (Boheman, 1855) i c g
 Charidotella inconstans (Boheman, 1855) i c g
 Charidotella incorrupta (Boheman, 1855) i c g
 Charidotella inculta (Boheman, 1855) i c g
 Charidotella irazuensis (Champion, 1894) i c g
 Charidotella jamaicensis (Blake, 1966) i c g
 Charidotella kesseli Borowiec, 1989 i c g
 Charidotella latevittata (Boheman, 1855) i c g
 Charidotella limpida (Boheman, 1855) i c g
 Charidotella linigera (Boheman, 1862) i c g
 Charidotella liquida (Erichson, 1847) i c g
 Charidotella marcidula (Boheman, 1862) i c g
 Charidotella marculenta (Boheman, 1855) i c g
 Charidotella marginepunctata Borowiec, 2004 i c g
 Charidotella moraguesi Borowiec, 2007 i c g
 Charidotella morio (Fabricius, 1801) i c
 Charidotella myops (Boheman, 1855) i c g
 Charidotella nigriceps (Spaeth, 1936) i c
 Charidotella nigripennis Borowiec, 2009 i c g
 Charidotella oblectabilis (Spaeth, 1926) i c g
 Charidotella oblita (Suffrian, 1868) i c g
 Charidotella obnubilata (Weise, 1921) i c g
 Charidotella opulenta (Boheman, 1855) i c g
 Charidotella ormondensis (Blatchley, 1920) i c g
 Charidotella pacata Borowiec, 2007 i c g
 Charidotella pallescens (Boheman, 1855) i c g
 Charidotella pectoralis (Kirsch, 1883) i c g
 Charidotella pellucida (Boheman, 1855) i c g
 Charidotella peruviana (Spaeth, 1942) i c
 Charidotella polita (Klug, 1829) i c g
 Charidotella posticata (Boheman, 1855) i c g
 Charidotella praeusta (Boheman, 1855) i c g
 Charidotella proxima (Boheman, 1855) i c g
 Charidotella pudica (Boheman, 1855) i c g
 Charidotella puella (Boheman, 1855) i c g
 Charidotella purpurata (Boheman, 1855) i c g b
 Charidotella purpurea (Linnaeus, 1758) i c g
 Charidotella quadrisignata (Boheman, 1855) i c g
 Charidotella rasilis (Spaeth, 1926) i c g
 Charidotella recidiva (Spaeth, 1926) i c g
 Charidotella rubicunda (Guérin-Méneville, 1844) i c g
 Charidotella santaremi Borowiec, 1995 i c g
 Charidotella semiatrata (Boheman, 1862) i c g
 Charidotella seriatopunctata (Spaeth, 1901) i c g
 Charidotella sexpunctata (Fabricius, 1781) i c g b  (golden tortoise beetle)
 Charidotella sinuata (Fabricius, 1781) i c g
 Charidotella steinhauseni Borowiec, 1989 i c g
 Charidotella striatopunctata (Boheman, 1855) i c g
 Charidotella stulta (Boheman, 1855) i c g
 Charidotella subannulata (Boheman, 1862) i c g
 Charidotella submaculata (Boheman, 1855) i c g
 Charidotella subnotata (Boheman, 1855) i c g
 Charidotella subsignata (Boheman, 1862) i c g
 Charidotella succinea (Boheman, 1855) i c g b
 Charidotella tricolorata (Champion, 1894) i c g
 Charidotella tuberculata (Fabricius, 1775) i c g
 Charidotella tumida (Champion, 1894) i c g
 Charidotella ventricosa (Boheman, 1855) i c g
 Charidotella vinula (Boheman, 1855) i c g
 Charidotella virgo (Boheman, 1855) i c g
 Charidotella virgulata (Boheman, 1855) i c g
 Charidotella zona (Fabricius, 1801) i c g

Data sources: i = ITIS, c = Catalogue of Life, g = GBIF, b = Bugguide.net

References

Charidotella
Articles created by Qbugbot